Nová Sídla is a municipality and village in Svitavy District in the Pardubice Region of the Czech Republic. It has about 200 inhabitants.

Administrative parts
The village of Sedlíšťka is an administrative part of Nová Sídla.

References

Villages in Svitavy District